A Misbaha, subḥa (Arabic, Kurdish and Urdu), tasbīḥ (Iran, India, Afghanistan, Tajikistan, Bangladesh, Pakistan, and Indonesia ), or tespih (Turkish, Bosnian and Albanian) is prayer beads often used by Muslims for the tasbih, the recitation of prayers, the dhikr, as well as to glorify Allah.

Use
A misbaḥah is a tool that is used as an aid to perform dhikr, including the names of God in Islam, and after regular prayer. It is often made of wooden or plastic beads, but also of olive seeds, ivory, pearls, and semi-precious stones such as carnelian, onyx, and amber.

A typical misbahah consists of three groups of beads, separated by two distinct beads (called imāms) along with one larger piece (called the yad) to serve as the handle. The exact number may vary, but they usually consist of 99 beads to assist in the glorification of God following prayers: 33 Tasbeeh (subhāna-llāh ), 33 Tahmeed (ʾal-ḥamdu li-llāh), and 34 Takbeer (ʾAllāhu ʾakbar). Some suggest the 99 beads also refer to the 99 names of Allah. Smaller misbahas consist of 33 beads, in which case one cycles through them three times to complete 99. However, misbahas may also consist of 100 or 200-count beads to assist in the dhikr duties of certain Sufi orders.

It is often carried by pilgrims, dervishes, and many ordinary Muslims of all groups, except for Wahhabis, who consider it heretical innovation (bid'ah) and only allow dhikrs to be counted on the fingers. Many Shi'is use beads made from clay from Karbala, sometimes colored red in memory of the killed Imam Husayn's blood or green in memory of his brother Hasan (who supposedly turned green from poisoning).

Misbahahs are also used culturally to reduce stress or as an indication of status in society.

History
It is thought that in the early Muslim era, people used loose pebbles or counted on their fingers.

According to the 17th-century Shia cleric ʻAllāmah Muhammad Baqir Majlisi, after the 625CE Battle of Uḥud, Fāṭimah (the daughter of Muhammad) would visit the Martyrs' graveyard every two or three days, and then made a misbaḥah of Ḥamzah ibn ʻAbd al-Muṭṭalib's grave-soil. After that, people started making and using misbaḥahs.

Some hadiths state the benefit of using the fingers of the right hand to count tasbīḥ following regular prayers.

The practice of using misbahahs most likely originated among Sufis and poor people. Opposition to the practice is known from as late as the 15th century, when al-Suyuti wrote an apologia for it.

See also

 Prayer beads
 Rosary
 Prayer rope
 Kombolói
 Japamala

Gallery

Citations

Bibliography

External links
 History of the Tasbih in Iran

Islamic culture
Prayer beads
Islamic terminology